Luo Hongshi (born 22 January 1999) is a Chinese footballer currently playing as a midfielder for Beijing BSU.

Club career
Luo was invited to join the academy of Valencia as part of the Wanda Group initiative to bring young Chinese players to Spanish clubs.

Career statistics

Club
.

Notes

References

1999 births
Living people
Chinese footballers
Association football midfielders
China League Two players
Valencia CF players
Dalian Professional F.C. players
Beijing Sport University F.C. players
Chinese expatriate footballers
Chinese expatriate sportspeople in Spain
Expatriate footballers in Spain